United Nations Security Council Resolution 198, adopted on December 18, 1964, after reaffirming previous resolutions on the topic of Cyprus, the Council extended the stationing of the United Nations Peacekeeping Force in Cyprus for an additional 3 months, to end on March 26, 1965.

See also
Cyprus dispute
List of United Nations Security Council Resolutions 101 to 200 (1953–1965)

References
Text of the Resolution at undocs.org

External links
 

 0198
 0198
1964 in Cyprus
December 1964 events